Chakkittapara is a panchayat as well as a town in the Kozhikode district of Kerala state, India. Chakkittapara borders Wayanad district to the east. Administratively, Chakkittapara comes under the Perambra block panchayat and Koyilandy Taluk, containing 15 wards and destinations like Kulathuvayal, Peruvannamuzhi, Chempanoda, Poozhithode, Muthukadu, Koovapoyil, Narinada, Chempra, and Pannikkottoor.

Geography
Kuttiady Dam, part of Kuttiady Irrigation Project, is located at Peruvannamuzhi which is near to Chakkittapara town. Its vast reservoir gives a panoramic view of lakes around both Chakkitapara Panchayath . Annankuttanchal is a growing tourist destination, which is included in the tourist map of the Malabar region.  Major attractions include the dam site, garden, water reservoir, crocodile farm, snake farm, spice gardens, and wildlife sanctuary. Boats may be rented for water safaris on the kilometers-long reservoir.

Educational institutions 

St. George school high school Kulathuvayal. 
St Antony's LP School Chakkittapara
ST. Anns public school Chakkittapara 
Pushpa LP School Narinada.
Fathima Matha school is at Peruvannamuzhi.
St.joseph high school chembanoda 
Raymond public school at Chempanoda.
GLPS Pillaperuvanna 
 St George LPS Kulathuvayal

Hospitals
 Public Health Center, Peruvannamuzhi
 Ayurvedic Hospital, Chempanoda
 Homeopathic Hospital, Muthukadu
Little Flower Hospital, Koodakkolli

Transportation
Chakkittappara village connects to other parts of India through Vatakara town on the west and Kuttiady town on the east.  National highway No.66 passes through Vatakara and the northern stretch connects to Mangalore, Goa and Mumbai.  The southern stretch connects to Cochin and Trivandrum.  The eastern National Highway No.54 going through Kuttiady connects to Mananthavady, Mysore and Bangalore. The nearest airports are at Kannur and Kozhikode.  The nearest railway station is at Vatakara.

Kuttiady area